Tmolus (Tmōlos) was a mythical Greek king of Lydia and husband to Omphale. In Greek mythology he figures as a mountain god, a son of Ares and Theogone and he judged the musical contest between Pan and Apollo. When Tmolus was gored to death by a bull on the mountain that bears his name, his widow, Omphale, became queen-regnant of Lydia. Through her, Lydian reign passed into the hands of the Tylonid (Heraclid) dynasty. He is almost certainly the same as the Tmolus who was the father of Tantalus by Plouto according to a scholion to Euripides Orestes 5.

Notes

References

Catholic Encyclopaedia (passim)
 Gantz, Timothy, Early Greek Myth: A Guide to Literary and Artistic Sources, Johns Hopkins University Press, 1996, Two volumes:  (Vol. 1),  (Vol. 2).
Ovid's Metamorphoses, Book 11, tr. Arthur Golding. http://www.elizabethanauthors.com/ovid11.htm
 Smith, William; Dictionary of Greek and Roman Biography and Mythology, London (1873). "Tmolus 1." 

Greek gods
Children of Ares
Demigods in classical mythology
Anatolian characters in Greek mythology
Deeds of Pan (god)
Deeds of Apollo